County Route 565 (CR 565) is a county highway in the U.S. state of New Jersey. The highway extends  from U.S. Route 206 / Route 15 in Frankford Township to McAfee Glenwood Road (CR 517) in Vernon Township.

Route description

CR 565 begins at an intersection with US 206 and the northern terminus of Route 15 in Frankford Township, heading northeast on two-lane undivided Ross Corner-Sussex Road. The road runs through hilly areas of woods and farms with a few homes, continuing into Wantage Township. Here, the route intersects CR 637 before reaching a junction with CR 628. At this point, CR 565 turns southeast onto Compton Road while CR 628 continues northeast on Ross Corner-Sussex Road. The route turns northeast onto Lewisburg Road and reaches an intersection with Route 23. CR 565 turns east to form a concurrency with Route 23 on a three-lane road with a center left-turn lane, passing a few businesses. Upon splitting from Route 23, CR 565 heads east on two-lane undivided Glenwood Road. The road makes a turn northeast into Vernon Township and intersects CR 667 and CR 641. In Vernon Township, CR 565 serves as a mountain pass between the summit of Pochuck Mountain and the ridge's lesser peak Glenwood Mountain.  This stretch of roadway passes through areas of woods and residential neighborhoods and crosses the Appalachian Trail.  The route reaches its northern terminus at CR 517 in the northern part of Vernon Township a short distance south of the New York border.

History
A spur route, County Route 565 Spur, existed, which is now Sussex County Route 628.

Major intersections

See also

References

External links

New Jersey 5xx Routes (Dan Moraseski)

565
565